The 2011–12 Ekstraklasa season was Lechia's 68th since their creation, and was their 4th continuous season in the top league of Polish football.

The season covers the period from 1 July 2011 to 30 June 2012.

Players

First team squad

Transfers

Players In

Out

League

Fixtures for the 2011–12 Ekstraklasa season

League table

Polish Cup

Stats

Goalscorers

References

Lechia Gdańsk seasons
Polish football clubs 2011–12 season